Dr. Rick Austin is an American politician. He was a Republican member of the Georgia State House of Representatives, and he represented the 10th District from January 12, 2009 until September 2011. Previously, he was a member of the Habersham County, Georgia, Board of Commissioners for three years. District 10 of the Georgia House of Representatives encompasses all of Habersham County and parts of White County.

In the 2009 election, he ran unopposed in the general election.  Austin is a graduate of Piedmont College, Auburn University, and the University of Mississippi, where he received his PhD in Biology in 1997. He is an associate biology professor at Piedmont College in Demorest, Georgia, his hometown. In 2011 Austin attempted a bid for the Georgia State Senate District 50, and ultimately lost.

Austin got into politics to reform education in Georgia. His wife, Jennifer, is a fifth grade teacher at Demorest Elementary. Austin is a supporter of the CRCT test as a requirement for students to pass their grade.  In 2009, he supported a bill to force first and second grade students to take the CRCT to pass.

Austin is also a camp director for Piedmont College's bug camp.  The camp exposes local children to the different insects that call Northeast Georgia their home.

In August 2013, Austin declared his intention to qualify for the position of mayor of the city of Demorest in the November elections.  He cited an investigation by the Georgia Bureau of Investigation into irregularities with the city's 2012 audit for his reasoning to run. He claims there is an excess of $200,000 missing money within the city government. Austin won the November 2013 election, and took oath in January 2014.

See also
List of Auburn University people

References

External links
 Georgia General Assembly - Rick Austin

Members of the Georgia House of Representatives
Living people
1966 births
Auburn University alumni
University of Mississippi alumni